Christopher Peter Sims OBE, QPM, DL is the former Chief Constable of West Midlands Police (WMP), England's second largest and the United Kingdom's third largest police force.

Police career
Sims began his policing career in 1980 with the Metropolitan Police force, rising to the rank of chief inspector.

He moved to Staffordshire Police in 1994 on promotion to superintendent. He worked in the professional standards unit, helped establish the performance development team, worked in CID at headquarters and spent a short time as divisional commander at Wombourne before taking up the role of divisional commander at Hanley.

He left Staffordshire in March 1999 to take up the role of Assistant Chief Constable for West Midlands Police. Sims was later appointed Deputy Chief Constable – a post he held for three years. During his time with West Midlands Police, Sims was seconded to Nottinghamshire Police to act as a strategic advisor.

Before taking up his previous role as Chief Constable of Staffordshire in September 2007, Sims was the Deputy Chief Executive and Director of Policing Policy and Practice at the National Policing Improvement Agency (NPIA) based in London. He was responsible for research and evaluation, doctrine development and implementation and portfolio management.

Sims took up new responsibilities as Chief Constable of West Midlands Police on 1 June 2009, and was paid a salary of £172,000 a year.

He retired as Chief Constable of the force on 31 December 2015 and was replaced by Deputy Chief Constable Dave Thompson.

Sims was awarded an OBE for services to the police in the 2003 New Years Honours List and a Queen's Police Medal for distinguished service in the 2010 Queen's Birthday Honours List.

Personal life
A graduate of St Peter's College, Oxford, Sims also achieved an MBA from Warwick University. Sims has three children.

Honours

 He also serves as a Deputy Lieutenant for the County of the West Midlands. This gives him the right to the Post Nominal Letters "DL" for Life.

References

External links
Chris Sims biography on WMP website

Alumni of St Peter's College, Oxford
Alumni of the University of Warwick
Chief Constables of West Midlands Police
Deputy Lieutenants of the West Midlands (county)
Officers of the Order of the British Empire
English recipients of the Queen's Police Medal
Metropolitan Police officers
Living people
20th-century births
Year of birth missing (living people)